Vladimir Kim "Valle" Andersen (born 24 April 1989) is a professional Danish darts player.

Career
He has been picked 11 times for the Danish national team at the age of 24.

He won the German Gold Cup and Dortmund Open in 2012, beating respectively Tobias Muller and Dominik Wiegmann.

In 2012, at the Nordic invitational, he won the pairs event together with Frede Johansen beating Daniel Larsson and Johan Engström from Sweden in the final.

He partnered Per Laursen in the 2010 World Cup of Darts losing in the first round to Austria.

Andersen was scheduled to play Sweden's Peter Sajwani at the 2016 BDO World Darts Championship but was removed from the field on 27 November 2015 after being suspended by the Danish Darts Union.

At the 2022 PDC Q-School, Andersen became the first Dane to qualify for a tour card via Q-School ever, securing a 2-year tourcard for the 2022 & 2023 season. He finished 10th in the European Order of Merit, with a total of 6 points.

Performance timeline

PDC

BDO

References

External links
 http://www.dartsdatabase.co.uk/PlayerDetails.aspx?playerKey=2191

Danish darts players
Living people
1989 births
PDC World Cup of Darts Danish team
British Darts Organisation players
Professional Darts Corporation current tour card holders
People from Vejle Municipality
Sportspeople from the Region of Southern Denmark